The Philippine House Committee on Human Rights, or House Human Rights Committee is a standing committee of the Philippine House of Representatives.

Jurisdiction 
As prescribed by House Rules, the committee's jurisdiction includes the following:
 Assistance to victims of human rights violations and their families
 Prevention of human rights violations
 Protection and enhancement of human rights
 Punishment of perpetrators of human rights violations

Members, 19th Congress

Historical members

18th Congress

See also 
 House of Representatives of the Philippines
 List of Philippine House of Representatives committees
 Commission on Human Rights
 Human rights in the Philippines

Notes

References

External links 
House of Representatives of the Philippines

Human Rights
Human rights in the Philippines